Broken Wax is a 2006 EP by Black Milk, a rapper and hip hop producer from Detroit, Michigan. It features appearances from Mr. Porter of D12, Phat Kat, T3, Elzhi, Fat Ray and Nametag. The instrumental version of the album was included as a bonus disc in Black Milk's next album, Popular Demand.

Track listing
 "Broken Wax" - 1:10
 "Pressure" - 2:48
 "Keep It Live" (feat. Mr. Porter) - 3:13
 "U's a Freak Bitch" - 3:01
 "Tell 'Em" (feat. Nametag) - 2:37
 "Danger" (feat. T3 & Phat Kat) - 3:33
 "S.O.T.C." (feat. Fat Ray & Elzhi) - 3:51
 "Outro" - 1:16

References

External links
 

2006 EPs
Black Milk albums
Albums produced by Black Milk
Fat Beats Records EPs